Philip Holm (born 8 December 1991) is a Swedish professional ice hockey defenseman who is currently playing with Örebro HK of the Swedish Hockey League (SHL).

Playing career
Holm began playing hockey in Huddinge IK before moving to Djurgårdens IF. He moved to Nacka HK for the 2008–09 season, where he played in their under-18 and under-20 teams. Holm also made an appearance in the club's senior team in the Swedish third-level league Division 1. He received more games with Nacka's senior team during the following season while still playing in the under-20 team. Holm returned to Djurgården and their under-20 team for the 2010–11 season.

Holm signed a two-year contract with Djurgården in February 2011. He was named as an extra player in the league game against Skellefteå AIK on 3 March 2011, but did not get any time on the ice. He played seven games, scoring one goal, with Djurgården in the 2011 edition of the pre-season tournament European Trophy. Holm received his first time on the ice in an Elitserien game in the league premier against HV71 on 15 September 2011. Holm scored his first Elitserien goal in the away game against Skellefteå AIK on 4 October.

After six seasons within the Djurgården organization, Holm left as a free agent in signing a two-year contract with fellow SHL competitors, the Växjö Lakers, on 20 April 2016.

Holm played one season with the Lakers before he implemented his NHL out clause in agreeing to a one-year, entry-level contract with the Vancouver Canucks on 26 May 2017.

To begin the 2017–18 season, Holm was assigned to the Canucks' American Hockey League (AHL) affiliate, the Utica Comets. On February 13, 2018, Holm was recalled by the Canucks and made his NHL debut, appearing in a solitary game before returning to the Comets. On February 26, 2018, the Canucks dealt Holm at the NHL trade deadline to the Vegas Golden Knights in exchange for Brendan Leipsic. The Golden Knight immediately assigned him to affiliate, the Chicago Wolves of the AHL for the remainder of the season.

On 17 July 2018, Holm (a restricted free agent) opted to leave North America in agreeing to a one-year contract with Torpedo Nizhny Novgorod of the Kontinental Hockey League (KHL). During his lone season with the club, Holm recorded seven goals and 26 points in 61 games. He also skated in the 2019 KHL All-Star Game.

On 13 August 2019, Holm made his return to North America, signing a one-year, two-way contract with the Chicago Blackhawks. Unable to secure a roster position with the Blackhawks at training camp, Holm began the 2019–20 season in the AHL with affiliate, the Rockford IceHogs. Holm made 30 appearances with Rockford, registering four goals and 15 points, before opting to mutually terminate his contract with the Blackhawks in order to resume his European career.

On 7 January 2020, Holm joined Lausanne HC of the National League (NL) on a one-year deal through the remainder of the 2019–20 season. He was brought in as a replacement for struggling fellow countryman, Jonas Junland.

As a free agent leading into the 2020–21 season, Holm returned to the KHL in agreeing to a one-year deal on 20 November 2020 with Metallurg Magnitogorsk. Holm found instant success with Magnitogorsk, posting 9 points in 22 regular season games, before leading the blueline in the playoffs with 7 points through 12 post-season games. 

Holm opted to continue his career in the KHL, signing a two-year contract as a free agent with the Finnish-based club, Jokerit on 5 May 2021.

As a free agent following Jokerit's withdrawal from the KHL, Holm opted to return to Sweden in signing a three-year contract with Örebro HK of the SHL, commencing in the 2022–23 season on 29 July 2022.

Career statistics

Regular season and playoffs

International

References

External links

1991 births
Chicago Wolves players
Djurgårdens IF Hockey players
Lausanne HC players
Living people
Metallurg Magnitogorsk players
Örebro HK players
Rockford IceHogs (AHL) players
Ice hockey people from Stockholm
Swedish ice hockey defencemen
Torpedo Nizhny Novgorod players
Utica Comets players
Växjö Lakers players
Vancouver Canucks players
Undrafted National Hockey League players
Ice hockey players at the 2022 Winter Olympics
Olympic ice hockey players of Sweden